Starourazayevo (İśke Urazay) is a rural locality (a village) in Arlansky Selsoviet, Krasnokamsky District, Bashkortostan, Russia. The population was 36 as of 2010. There are 3 streets.

Geography 
Starourazayevo is located 20 km south of Nikolo-Beryozovka (the district's administrative centre) by road. Novourazayevo is the nearest rural locality.

References 

Rural localities in Krasnokamsky District